Lloyd Barrington LaBeach (28 June 1922 – 19 February 1999) was a Panamanian sprinter, who won two bronze medals during the 1948 Summer Olympics, the first Olympic medals for Panama and for Central America. He also competed in the long jump.

In the 100 meters, he finished behind Harrison Dillard and Barney Ewell for third place, ahead of favorite Mel Patton.

Born in Panama City, his parents were Jamaican immigrants. While Lloyd was still in school the family relocated to Jamaica, where La Beach first showed his talent in athletics. He later entered the University of California, Los Angeles, where he was coached during his preparations for the Olympic Games.

In 1948, he set the world record in the 200 meters on a cinder track in Compton, California. After the race, he was described in Time as "Panama's one-man Olympic hope." Just a few weeks before La Beach had been involved in a world record setting 100-yard dash, in which he barely lost at the finish line tape to Patton. These 1948 performances made him one of the expected medal contenders against Patton and Ewell in the Olympics. His brother Byron LaBeach, also a sprinter, competed in the 1952 Summer Olympics representing Jamaica.

LaBeach retired from athletics in 1957, and died in New York City, on 19 February 1999, at the age of 76.

Competition record

Notes

1922 births
1999 deaths
Sportspeople from Panama City
Athletes (track and field) at the 1948 Summer Olympics
Olympic athletes of Panama
Olympic bronze medalists for Panama
Panamanian male sprinters
Panamanian male long jumpers
Central American and Caribbean Games gold medalists for Panama
Central American and Caribbean Games silver medalists for Panama
Competitors at the 1946 Central American and Caribbean Games
Competitors at the 1950 Central American and Caribbean Games
Panamanian people of Jamaican descent
Medalists at the 1948 Summer Olympics
Olympic bronze medalists in athletics (track and field)
Central American and Caribbean Games medalists in athletics
Panamanian expatriates in the United States